Okhinsky District is an administrative district (raion) of Sakhalin Oblast, Russia; one of the seventeen in the oblast. Municipally, it is incorporated as Okhinsky Urban Okrug. It is located in the north of the Island of Sakhalin. Its administrative center is the town of Okha. Population (excluding the administrative center):

References

Notes

Sources

Districts of Sakhalin Oblast